Cam Severson (born August 15, 1978) is a Canadian former professional ice hockey centre.

Draft 
Severson was drafted in the eighth round, 192nd overall, by the San Jose Sharks in the 1997 NHL Entry Draft.

Career 
After playing five full seasons in the Western Hockey League and part of a sixth, Severson joined the Central Hockey League's Oklahoma City Blazers during the 1998–99 season.  He spent the 1999–2000 season in the East Coast Hockey League and part of the 2000–01 season in the United Hockey League before joining the American Hockey League. He has spent the majority of his professional career playing for various AHL teams, with a few stops in the National Hockey League.

Severson played two games for the Mighty Ducks of Anaheim in the 2002–03 season, and thirty-one in the 2003–04 season, during which he scored three goals.  He appeared in games with the Columbus Blue Jackets in the 2005–06 season, after his rights were acquired from the Calgary Flames on February 28 in exchange for Cale Hulse.

Severson moved to Germany's Deutsche Eishockey Liga in 2006, joining the Straubing Tigers. He stayed with the Tigers partway through the 2007–08 season and then moved on to play for the Linz Black Wings or the Erste Bank Liga for the remainder of the season.

In 2008, Severson was offered a job as an assistant coach of the Spokane Chiefs, a major junior team in the Western Hockey League, but instead joined Steaua București Hockey, a Romanian Hockey League team, becoming the first Canadian and the first former NHL player to play in Romania. Midway through the season, Severson was named assistant coach of the team, and then head coach. He was a coach/player for Steaua București Hockey of the Romanian Hockey League and Liga MOL in Romania and signed with the Mississippi RiverKings on 18 August 2009 as a player-coach.

Coaching career
In 2010, Severson joined the Spokane Jr. Chiefs Bantam AAA Hockey Team in Spokane, Washington as their head coach. He also puts on various camps throughout the year at the Eagles Ice-a-Rena, including Sever's Summer Hockey School, and enlists the help of current and former WHL and KIJHL players, such as Tyler Johnson and Tanner Mort of the Spokane Chiefs, Tyler Alos of the Seattle Thunderbirds, and others.

In 2012, Severson founded Compete Hockey Schools and Compete Hockey Academy based out of Coeur d'Alene, Idaho. Compete Hockey Schools runs numerous youth hockey development camps throughout Washington, Idaho, and Alaska. Compete Hockey Academy is the first hockey prep school program in the Western United States. Compete Hockey Academy teams play in the Canadian Sports School Hockey League  as well as attend various showcase tournaments throughout the United States. Compete Hockey Academy currently has 15-, 16-, 17- and 18-year-old players from Alaska, Arizona, Colorado, Wyoming, Washington, Idaho, Texas, Canada, Russia, and Ukraine.

Career statistics

Regular season and playoffs

References

External links

1978 births
Living people
Canadian ice hockey centres
Cincinnati Mighty Ducks players
Columbus Blue Jackets players
Hartford Wolf Pack players
Ice hockey people from Saskatchewan
Kamloops Blazers players
Lethbridge Hurricanes players
Louisiana IceGators (ECHL) players
Mighty Ducks of Anaheim players
Milwaukee Admirals players
Omaha Ak-Sar-Ben Knights players
Peoria Rivermen (ECHL) players
Portland Pirates players
Prince Albert Raiders players
Quad City Mallards (UHL) players
San Jose Sharks draft picks
Steaua Rangers players
Canadian expatriate ice hockey players in Romania
Straubing Tigers players
Swift Current Broncos players
Syracuse Crunch players
Canadian expatriate ice hockey players in the United States